KKAT (860 kHz) is an AM radio station broadcasting a talk format. KKAT is licensed to Salt Lake City, Utah and is owned by Cumulus Media.  The station's studios are located in South Salt Lake (behind the I-15/I-80 interchange).

KKAT broadcasts at 10,000 watts by day but must reduce its power to 196 watts at night because it is on a clear channel frequency reserved for CJBC Toronto, the dominant Class A station on 860 kHz.  During critical hours, KKAT is powered at 3,000 watts.  It uses a non-directional antenna at all times.  The transmitter is off West 2590 South, near the Redwood Nature Area in West Valley City.

Programming
KKAT carries mostly nationally syndicated conservative talk hosts, largely from the co-owned Westwood One Network.  Shows include Armstrong & Getty, Ben Shapiro, Dan Bongino, Dave Ramsey, Mark Levin, John Batchelor, Michael Knowles, Red Eye Radio and First Light.

On weekends, shows on money, real estate, gardening, real estate, food and wine are heard, as well as Chris Plante, Daniele Lin and repeats of weekday shows.  World and national news from Fox News Radio airs at the beginning of most hours.

History
On November 15, 1955, the station first signed on the air.  It had the call sign KWHO. The station aired a classical music format. Initially, KWHO operated during daytime hours only with 1,000 watts of power.

In July 1985, the station became KUTR, and it began airing an "LDS Contemporary" format, which consisted of mix of music that was 50% songs by Mormon artists and 50% standard soft adult contemporary. On June 21, 1989, the station's callsign was changed to KLZX, and it began simulcasting the classic rock format of its sister station 93.3 KLZX-FM (now KUBL-FM).

On November 15, 1990, the station changed its call letters to KCNR. As KCNR, the station carried programming from CNN Headline News and was branded "News Radio 860 AM." In 1992 KCNR's format and call sign moved to 1320 AM, and the station again simulcast its classic rock sister station 93.3 KLZX-FM "Z-93". On August 11, 1992, the station again changed its call sign to KLZX.  On September 6, 1994, the station began airing an all-news format from Associated Press Newsworld, and on January 23, 1995, the station's call sign was changed to KAPN. On August 20, 1996, KCNR's news/talk format moved from 1320 to 860, and on September 20, 1996 the station's call sign was changed back to KCNR.

On November 18, 1996, the station became an affiliate of Radio Disney. On March 3, 1999, the station's callsign was changed to KBEE. In 2003, Radio Disney moved to AM 910, and on May 15, 2003, the station began airing a classic country format from the Jones Radio Network. While a classic country station, the station was branded "The Coyote". On July 5, 2004, the station's callsign was changed to KKAT. In October 2007, the station changed formats from classic country to oldies, carrying Scott Shannon's The True Oldies Channel from Citadel Media. While airing an oldies format, the station was branded "The Wolf". On October 5, 2009, the station changed to a talk format branded "Utah's Big Talker".

See also
KKLV - former sister station.

References

External links
Cumulus Media Salt Lake City

FCC History Cards for KKAT

Mass media in Salt Lake City
KAT
Talk radio stations in the United States
Cumulus Media radio stations
Radio stations established in 1956
1956 establishments in Utah